Tatum Antoine Bell (born March 2, 1981) is a former American football running back. He was drafted by the Denver Broncos in the second round of the 2004 NFL Draft. He played college football at Oklahoma State. He is son of Tony and Terry Bell. Has a younger brother, T.J., and an older sister, Latrice Coleman.

Bell also played for the Detroit Lions and Florida Tuskers.

Early years
Bell was born in Dallas, Texas and grew up in DeSoto, a suburb of Dallas. He attended DeSoto High School. In high school, he was considered one of the fastest high school players in the nation, he was clocked running 4.34 in the 40-yard dash, and 10.26 seconds over 100 meters.

He was hampered by a hip pointer and sprained ankle as a senior, but still rushed for 1,225 yards and 19 touchdowns. He was also an effective kick and punt returner. In addition to his 19 rushing touchdowns, he had three touchdown passes and returned one kickoff for a touchdown. He was listed as a Top 100 Texas player by First Down Recruiting, PrepStar, the Dallas Morning News and David Garvin. He was a two-time all-district selection at running back.

College career
Bell played for Oklahoma State University from 2000 to 2003, and was a starter for three years, rushing for a total of 4,285 yards. The schools 4th all-time leading rusher. Tatum Bell's Rushing Touchdowns places him 4th all-time in school history with 43.

In 2000, as a true freshman, he made an impact by rushing for 251 yards on just 49 carries. He followed the regular season with an impressive spring during which he showed the new OSU staff he had the ability to run the ball inside. He was OSU's leading rusher in both major spring scrimmages. His spring numbers included 14 carries for 110 yards and three touchdowns in the first scrimmage and 15 carries for 80 yards and a touchdown in the second. Showed most of the country what he was capable of with an incredible long-distance run against Oklahoma in a nationally televised season finale on Lewis Field. Oklahoma State won the services of this highly recruited running back over Nebraska, Texas and Oklahoma. He was a starter for three years, rushing for a total of 4,285 yards.

In 2001, he carried the ball 237 times for 1,052 yards and eight touchdowns. He averaged 87.6 yards per game and almost four and a half yards per carry. Bell eclipsed the 100-yard rushing mark twice last season, including a career-high 117 yards against Missouri. He had 102 yards in Oklahoma State's win over Louisiana Tech on Lewis Field. The last four games of the 2001 season were particularly impressive for Bell. Against Colorado, Texas Tech, Baylor and Oklahoma, Bell carried the ball a combined 80 times for 333 yards. That's a four-game average of 83.25 yards per game and 4.16 yards per carry.

In 2002, he carried the ball 215 Times for 1,454 yards and 15 Touchdowns.

In 2003; Bell's Senior Season he rushed for 1,528 on 253 Carries including a total of 19 Touchdowns.

Professional career

Pre-Draft

First stint with Broncos
At the NFL Combine, he had an explosive workout including a 4.32 40 yard dash, 25 reps of 225 pounds, and a 39.5 inch vertical jump.
 
Bell was drafted 41st overall in the 2004 NFL Draft, after attending Oklahoma State University for four years and finishing 3rd on the school's all-time career rushing yards list. The Broncos originally acquired the pick along with cornerback Champ Bailey in a trade that sent Clinton Portis to the Washington Redskins.

He debuted with the Denver Broncos in 2004, and led all AFC rookie running backs in rushing yards. In 2005 he was the second part of a dual running back system with Mike Anderson and rushed for 921 yards (gaining 5.3 yards per carry) and eight touchdowns. In 2006 Bell rushed for 1,025 yards and two touchdowns.

Detroit Lions
On March 1, 2007, Bell was traded along with George Foster and a draft pick to the Detroit Lions for Dré Bly.

On October 12, 2007 it was revealed that Bell had asked the Lions to trade him earlier in the week, due to the re-emergence of Kevin Jones and his diminished role at tailback. Bell has since told the media that he did not demand a trade, but that he simply was disappointed in his diminishing role on the team.

On March 10, 2008, Bell re-signed with the Lions on a one-year contract. He stated that his goal for the 2008 NFL season was to rush for 1,300 yards and 15 touchdowns. However, he was released by the Lions on September 1 after the team signed running back Rudi Johnson. The following day Johnson accused Bell of stealing his luggage. Bell insisted, "it was just an honest mistake."

Second stint with Broncos
Bell signed with the Broncos on November 11, 2008. (He had spent the previous three months working in the T-Mobile store at Town Center at Aurora.)  He was not re-signed following the season.

Florida Tuskers
Bell was signed by the Florida Tuskers of the United Football League on September 3, 2009. He wore #25. During the week of November 19 he ran for 365 yards and set a UFL record. He was released on August 24, 2010.

UFL records
 Most rushing yards in a single game: 365 (2009)

References

External links
 Just Sports Stats
 Tatum Bell's Profile Page at Pro-Football-Reference.com
 Twitter.com: @tspeedtx (Tatum Bell's Official Twitter Page)

1981 births
Living people
Players of American football from Dallas
American football running backs
Oklahoma State Cowboys football players
Denver Broncos players
Detroit Lions players
Florida Tuskers players
People from DeSoto, Texas